"" ("Where the Lemons Blossom", or "Where the Citrons Bloom"), Op. 364, is a waltz by Johann Strauss II written in 1874. The waltz was composed during a tour of the composer in Italy where he travelled with the Langenbach Orchestra of Germany and performed the work at the Teatro Regio in Turin on 9 May 1874.

The waltz came after a successful premiere of his famous operetta Die Fledermaus and Strauss originally entitled the waltz as "Bella Italia" (Beautiful Italy) for his Italian audiences before renaming it "" after a quote from Johann Wolfgang von Goethe's novel Wilhelm Meisters Lehrjahre – "" (Do you know the land where the lemons blossom?).

Strauss's waltz (as most of his waltzes dating from around this time) follows the structure of an introduction followed by three two-part waltz sections and a coda, instead of his earlier format of five two-part sections. This structure was to feature in most of his later waltzes although he did not set it as a definite and permanent structure.

Waltz 1

The work begins in a tranquil fashion in G major, with a reflective solo violin melody in the introduction. A series of loud chords precedes the gentle first waltz section. The second section is more animated with a second part in D major. The wistful nature of the waltz is further expanded in the third section. A lively coda recalls earlier melodies and the first waltz section makes another entry. Near the end of the work, the introduction's solo violin melody returns before the waltz rises to a forte and climaxes with a timpani drumroll.

Vienna New Year's Concert 
The waltz was part of the Vienna New Year's Concert programmes as follows.
1951 – Clemens Krauss
1960 – Willi Boskovsky
1965 – Willi Boskovsky
1972 – Willi Boskovsky
1983 – Lorin Maazel
1988 – Claudio Abbado
1993 – Riccardo Muti
2007 – Zubin Mehta
2013 – Franz Welser-Möst
2020 – Andris Nelsons

References

Waltzes by Johann Strauss II